In algebra, a Mori domain, named after Yoshiro Mori by , is an integral domain satisfying the ascending chain condition on integral divisorial ideals. Noetherian domains and Krull domains both have this property. A commutative ring is a Krull domain if and only if it is a Mori domain and completely integrally closed. A polynomial ring over a Mori domain need not be a Mori domain. Also, the complete integral closure of a Mori domain need not be a Mori (or, equivalently, Krull) domain.

Notes

References 

Commutative algebra